Sir Tom Normanton (12 March 1917 – 6 August 1997) was a Conservative Party politician in the United Kingdom.

Early life and Summary
He was educated at Malsis School in North Yorkshire from 1929 to 1931 and then attended Manchester Grammar School and Manchester University.  He joined the family textile business and served in the army in the Second World War, reaching the rank of Major. His obituary stated that he was an improbable combination of the flamboyant, the phlegmatic and the industrious.  He was an industrialist of some distinction, above all in the textile industry.  He exhibited intense patriotism together with European idealism.  He was invited back to Malsis School to present the prizes at Open Day in 1979, but Richard Francis took his place.

Political career
Normanton contested Rochdale in the 1959 United Kingdom general election and 1964 general elections, but came third each time. He was elected at the 1970 general election as Member of Parliament (MP) for Cheadle, and stood down at the 1987 general election, when he was succeeded by Stephen Day. He was knighted in 1987.

From 1973 to 1979 he was a Member of the European Parliament (MEP), in the period before the European Parliament was directly elected.  He was then elected at the 1979 European Parliament election as the MEP for Cheshire East.  He was re-elected in 1984, and served as an MEP until 1989.

References

External links 

1917 births
People educated at Manchester Grammar School
Conservative Party (UK) MPs for English constituencies
UK MPs 1970–1974
UK MPs 1974
UK MPs 1974–1979
UK MPs 1979–1983
UK MPs 1983–1987
1997 deaths
Conservative Party (UK) MEPs
MEPs for the United Kingdom 1973–1979
MEPs for England 1979–1984
MEPs for England 1984–1989
People educated at Malsis School
Members of the Parliament of the United Kingdom for Cheadle